Idhuthanda Sattam is a 1992 Tamil language crime film directed by Senthilnathan. The film stars R. Sarathkumar, Rekha and Aamani. The film's music was written by Sangeetha Rajan. The film was released on 29 May 1992.

Plot
Selvaraj, an upright police officer, takes charge as a SP in a new area and he settles down there with his daughter Meena. A woman inspector Amudha helps him. Selvaraj challenges a notorious man Gurusami and his henchmen Kaali, Dharma and Soori to punish them. Amudha is intrigued by Selvaraj and he tells her about his tragic past.

In the past, Selvaraj lived happily with his wife Lakshmi, newborn baby and his father-in-law, the judge Venugopal. During the deepavali festival, they all witnessed a murder committed by the rowdy Gurusami. Gurusami sent his henchmen to kill Selvaraj's family. During the confrontation, Lakshmi and Venugopal were murdered, while Selvaraj was seriously injured and his baby spared. Gurusami was later sentenced to the death penalty but he managed to be released thanks to his henchmen. Selvaraj is now determined to punish them.

Cast

R. Sarathkumar as SP Selvaraj IPS
Rekha as Lakshmi
Aamani (credited as Meenakshi) as Amudha
Goundamani as Karuppan
Senthil
Mylai R.V. Gurupadam as Gurusami
Mansoor Ali Khan as Kaali
K. Natraj as Dharma
Justin as Soori
Senthilnathan as Ponnusamy
Typist Gopu
V. S. Raghavan as Venugopal
V. Gopalakrishnan as Commissioner
Idichapuli Selvaraj as Amudha's father
Suryakanth
Sharmili
Dharani
Kamala Kamesh
Surekha
Shanthi
K. S. Jayalakshmi as Gurusami's father
Baby Pushpambika as Meena (child)
Baby Jennifer as Meena (baby)

Soundtrack

The film score and the soundtrack were composed by Sangeetha Rajan. The soundtrack, released in 1992, features 3 tracks with lyrics written by Muthulingam and Piraisoodan.

Reception
RSP of The Indian Express gave the film a positive review citing "the dialogue is crisp and meaningful, Senthinathan's direction noteworthy. Sangeetha Rajan's music is average. R. Sarathkumar flexes his muscles well. Rekha is quite satisfactory in a small role".

References

External links

1992 films
1990s Tamil-language films
Fictional portrayals of the Tamil Nadu Police
Indian crime action films
1990s crime action films
Films directed by Senthilnathan